Sheryl Patrice Underwood (born October 28, 1963) is an American comedian, actress and television host. She first rose to prominence in the comedy world as the first female finalist in 1989's Miller Lite Comedy Search. Currently, Underwood is one of the hosts on the CBS Daytime talk show The Talk, becoming the show's longest running co-host, a role she first stepped into in September 2011. She has received one Daytime Emmy Award from seven nominations.

Early life
Underwood was born in Little Rock, Arkansas, and later moved to Atwater, California, where she attended high school. Her sister, Frankie, was diagnosed with polio.   Sheryl is now Frankie's caregiver.

Underwood revealed that she was born with a twin who did not survive. She went on to say that her mother lied to her, telling her that her father murdered her sister. Underwood admitted to carrying her sister's birth certificate around with her. She even stated that her mother stabbed her father, who survived, after Underwood had gotten close to her father, which her mother wanted to prevent after she lied to Underwood about her father being a murderer.

Professional career
After graduating college, Underwood joined the United States Air Force, where she served two years in the reserves. She later gained public notice as the first female finalist in the Miller Lite Comedy Search in 1989. She won the BET "Funniest Female Comedian on Comic View" award in 1994 and the BET Comedy Awards' Platinum Mic Viewers Choice Award in 2005.

Following her stand up success, Underwood took a number of minor acting roles, including Bad Mouth Bessie in the 1998 film I Got the Hook Up and Catfish Rita in the 2005 film Beauty Shop.

Underwood was the host of BET's Comic View and executive producer and host of the limited run comedy/variety series Holla (September 2002 – January 2003).  

Underwood was a contributor on the nationally syndicated Tom Joyner Morning Show until June 2010 when she joined The Steve Harvey Morning Show as a contributor.  She briefly hosted her own radio program, Sheryl Underwood and Company, for Radio One-owned Syndication One News/Talk and XM Satellite Radio's Channel 169 (The Power). On Tuesday nights, Underwood hosts The Sheryl Underwood Show on Jamie Foxx's Sirius Satellite Radio channel, The Foxxhole (Sirius 106) 

In 2011, Underwood became a co-host of the CBS Daytime talk show The Talk in its second season, replacing Leah Remini.

More recently, Underwood signed a multi-year development deal with CBS Studios.

Personal life
Underwood holds a Bachelor of Arts degree in liberal arts from the University of Illinois at Chicago and master's degrees in media management and mass communication from Governors State University. Underwood once served in the U.S. Armed Forces, and frequently makes jokes about "all the creative places you can get busy on a military base."

Underwood is a lifelong Republican. However, she campaigned for Barack Obama's re-election in 2012 United States presidential election. Underwood also campaigned for Hillary Clinton in the 2016 election "because we have to protect the legacy of President Obama. Low voter turnout benefits Donald Trump and the Republicans. He can't win."

Underwood is a lifetime member of Zeta Phi Beta sorority, first joining in 1990. She served as president of the organization's Omicron Rho Zeta chapter, as the National Chair of Honorary Members, National Executive Board Chair and International Grand Basileus. She also chartered a graduate chapter of Zeta Phi Beta in Inglewood, California.

In addition to the Zeta Phi Beta sorority, Underwood is also a member of the National Council of Negro Women and the NAACP. She also founded the African-American Female Comedian Association.

In the fall of 2011, Underwood revealed that after dating seven years, her husband—who might have suffered from clinical depression—died by suicide after they had been married three years.

Zeta Phi Beta presidency
Underwood was elected as the 23rd International Grand Basileus (President) during Zeta Phi Beta's biennial business meeting in Las Vegas, Nevada in 2008. Her election as Grand Basileus was disputed, but District of Columbia Superior Court Judge Gerald I. Fisher dismissed a lawsuit against the sorority and Underwood that asked the court to unseat her. Her election made her the first professional entertainer to hold the highest elected office of a National Pan-Hellenic Council organization.

Filmography

References

External links

 

1963 births
Living people
Actresses from Arkansas
American film actresses
Actresses from Little Rock, Arkansas
African-American actresses
African-American female comedians
American stand-up comedians
Arkansas Republicans
Black conservatism in the United States
Zeta Phi Beta
American women comedians
African-American radio personalities
University of Illinois Chicago alumni
Governors State University alumni
American twins
African-American television talk show hosts
American television talk show hosts
People from Atwater, California
Comedians from California
20th-century American comedians
21st-century American comedians
African-American Christians
United States Air Force airmen
United States Air Force reservists
20th-century American actresses
21st-century American actresses
20th-century African-American women
20th-century African-American people
21st-century African-American women
21st-century African-American people